This article lists Senegalese governments since Senegal's independence.

List 

 
 
 Third Sall government
 Fourth Sall government

References

See also 

 Politics of Senegal

Government of Senegal
Senegal